Change Your Life may refer to:

 "Change Your Life" (Anna Tsuchiya song), 2006
 "Change Your Life" (Far East Movement  song), 2012
 "Change Your Life" (Iggy Azalea song), 2013
 "Change Your Life" (Little Mix song), 2013
 Change Your Life!, 2010 mockumentary film